Gilbert William Barker (30 July 1882 – 6 September 1952) was an Australian rules footballer who played for the Fitzroy Football Club and University Football Club in the Victorian Football League (VFL).

An ex-Wesley College player, In his debut season Gilbert was part of the 1904 Fitzroy Premiership side on the half-forward flank. He then moved into the midfield for the rest of his career with Fitzroy, before playing back at half-forward in University's first year operating in the league.

Barker graduated as a doctor in mid 1908 and returned to Perth where he had spent 1907 as a trainee doctor.

He married Emma Lilly Keune in 1911 and they had three children. Barker died in 1952 after a long career as a surgeon in Perth.

References 

1882 births
1952 deaths
Fitzroy Football Club players
Fitzroy Football Club Premiership players
University Football Club players
Australian rules footballers from Victoria (Australia)
People educated at Wesley College (Victoria)
Two-time VFL/AFL Premiership players